Wheels Stop: The Tragedies and Triumphs of the Space Shuttle Program, 1986-2011 is a 2013 nonfiction book by Rick Houston. Wheels Stop tells the stirring story of how, after the Space Shuttle Challenger disaster, the Space Shuttle not only recovered but went on to perform its greatest missions.

The book is part of the Outward Odyssey spaceflight history series by the University of Nebraska Press.

Wheels Stop was reviewed in the Air & Space Smithsonian magazine, and by the American Library Association's Booklist.

References

External links
 Wheels Stop Official Publisher Site
 Book review by Jeff Foust of The Space Review
 Book review on Publishers Weekly

2013 non-fiction books
Spaceflight books
Space Shuttle program
University of Nebraska Press books